Mao Zedong (26 December 1893 – 9 September 1976), also known as Chairman Mao, was a Chinese communist revolutionary who was the founder of the People's Republic of China (PRC), which he led as the chairman of the Chinese Communist Party from the establishment of the PRC in 1949 until his death in 1976. Ideologically a Marxist–Leninist, his theories, military strategies, and political policies are collectively known as Maoism.

Mao was the son of a prosperous peasant in Shaoshan, Hunan. He supported Chinese nationalism and had an anti-imperialist outlook early in his life, and was particularly influenced by the events of the Xinhai Revolution of 1911 and May Fourth Movement of 1919. He later adopted Marxism–Leninism while working at Peking University as a librarian and became a founding member of the Chinese Communist Party (CCP), leading the Autumn Harvest Uprising in 1927. During the Chinese Civil War between the Kuomintang (KMT) and the CCP, Mao helped to found the Chinese Workers' and Peasants' Red Army, led the Jiangxi Soviet's radical land reform policies, and ultimately became head of the CCP during the Long March. Although the CCP temporarily allied with the KMT under the Second United Front during the Second Sino-Japanese War (1937–1945), China's civil war resumed after Japan's surrender, and Mao's forces defeated the Nationalist government, which withdrew to Taiwan in 1949.

On 1 October 1949, Mao proclaimed the foundation of the PRC, a Marxist–Leninist single-party state controlled by the CCP. In the following years he solidified his control through the Chinese Land Reform against landlords, the Campaign to Suppress Counterrevolutionaries, the "Three-anti and Five-anti Campaigns", and through a truce in the Korean War, which altogether resulted in the deaths of several million Chinese. From 1953 to 1958, Mao played an important role in enforcing command economy in China, constructing the first Constitution of the PRC, launching the industrialisation program, and initiating military projects such as the "Two Bombs, One Satellite" project and Project 523. His foreign policies during this time were dominated by the Sino-Soviet split which drove a wedge between China and the Soviet Union. In 1955, Mao launched the Sufan movement, and in 1957 he launched the Anti-Rightist Campaign, in which at least 550,000 people, mostly intellectuals and dissidents, were persecuted. In 1958, he launched the Great Leap Forward that aimed to rapidly transform China's economy from agrarian to industrial, which led to the deadliest famine in history and the deaths of 15–55 million people between 1958 and 1962. In 1963, Mao launched the Socialist Education Movement, and in 1966 he initiated the Cultural Revolution, a program to remove "counter-revolutionary" elements in Chinese society which lasted 10 years and was marked by violent class struggle, widespread destruction of cultural artifacts, and an unprecedented elevation of Mao's cult of personality. Tens of millions of people were persecuted during the Revolution, while the estimated number of deaths ranges from hundreds of thousands to millions. After years of ill health, Mao suffered a series of heart attacks in 1976 and died at the age of 82. During Mao's era, China's population grew from around 550 million to over 900 million while the government did not strictly enforce its family planning policy.

Widely regarded as one of the most influential figures of the twentieth century, Mao remains a controversial figure within and outside China. The government during Mao's rule was also responsible for vast numbers of deaths, with estimates ranging from 40 to 80 million victims through starvation, persecution, prison labour, and mass executions. During his leadership tenure, China was heavily involved with other Asian communist conflicts such as the Korean War, the Vietnam War, and the Cambodian Civil War, which brought the Khmer Rouge to power. Beyond politics, Mao is also known as a theorist, military strategist, and poet. Mao has been praised for transforming China from a semi-colony to a leading world power, with greatly advanced literacy, women's rights, basic healthcare, primary education and life expectancy.

English romanisation of name
During Mao's lifetime, the English-language media universally rendered his name as Mao Tse-tung, using the Wade-Giles system of transliteration for Standard Chinese though with the circumflex accent in the syllable Tsê dropped. Due to its recognizability, the spelling was used widely, even by the Foreign Ministry of the PRC after Hanyu Pinyin became the PRC's official romanisation system for Mandarin Chinese in 1958; the well-known booklet of Mao's political statements, The Little Red Book, was officially entitled Quotations from Chairman Mao Tse-tung in English translations. While the pinyin-derived spelling Mao Zedong is increasingly common, the Wade-Giles-derived spelling Mao Tse-tung continues to be used in modern publications to some extent.

Early life

Youth and the Xinhai Revolution: 1893–1911
Mao Zedong was born on 26 December 1893, in Shaoshan village, Hunan. His father, Mao Yichang, was a formerly impoverished peasant who had become one of the wealthiest farmers in Shaoshan. Growing up in rural Hunan, Mao described his father as a stern disciplinarian, who would beat him and his three siblings, the boys Zemin and Zetan, as well as an adopted girl, Zejian. Mao's mother, Wen Qimei, was a devout Buddhist who tried to temper her husband's strict attitude. Mao too became a Buddhist, but abandoned this faith in his mid-teenage years. At age 8, Mao was sent to Shaoshan Primary School. Learning the value systems of Confucianism, he later admitted that he did not enjoy the classical Chinese texts preaching Confucian morals, instead favouring classic novels like Romance of the Three Kingdoms and Water Margin. At age 13, Mao finished primary education, and his father united him in an arranged marriage to the 17-year-old Luo Yixiu, thereby uniting their land-owning families. Mao refused to recognise her as his wife, becoming a fierce critic of arranged marriage and temporarily moving away. Luo was locally disgraced and died in 1910, at only 21 years old.

While working on his father's farm, Mao read voraciously and developed a "political consciousness" from Zheng Guanying's booklet which lamented the deterioration of Chinese power and argued for the adoption of representative democracy. Interested in history, Mao was inspired by the military prowess and nationalistic fervour of George Washington and Napoleon Bonaparte. His political views were shaped by Gelaohui-led protests which erupted following a famine in Changsha, the capital of Hunan; Mao supported the protesters' demands, but the armed forces suppressed the dissenters and executed their leaders. The famine spread to Shaoshan, where starving peasants seized his father's grain. He disapproved of their actions as morally wrong, but claimed sympathy for their situation. At age 16, Mao moved to a higher primary school in nearby Dongshan, where he was bullied for his peasant background.

In 1911, Mao began middle school in Changsha. Revolutionary sentiment was strong in the city, where there was widespread animosity towards Emperor Puyi's absolute monarchy and many were advocating republicanism. The republicans' figurehead was Sun Yat-sen, an American-educated Christian who led the Tongmenghui society. In Changsha, Mao was influenced by Sun's newspaper, The People's Independence (Minli bao), and called for Sun to become president in a school essay. As a symbol of rebellion against the Manchu monarch, Mao and a friend cut off their queue pigtails, a sign of subservience to the emperor.

Inspired by Sun's republicanism, the army rose up across southern China, sparking the Xinhai Revolution. Changsha's governor fled, leaving the city in republican control. Supporting the revolution, Mao joined the rebel army as a private soldier, but was not involved in fighting. The northern provinces remained loyal to the emperor, and hoping to avoid a civil war, Sun—proclaimed "provisional president" by his supporters—compromised with the monarchist general Yuan Shikai. The monarchy was abolished, creating the Republic of China, but the monarchist Yuan became president. The revolution over, Mao resigned from the army in 1912, after six months as a soldier. Around this time, Mao discovered socialism from a newspaper article; proceeding to read pamphlets by Jiang Kanghu, the student founder of the Chinese Socialist Party, Mao remained interested yet unconvinced by the idea.

Fourth Normal School of Changsha: 1912–1919
Over the next few years, Mao Zedong enrolled and dropped out of a police academy, a soap-production school, a law school, an economics school, and the government-run Changsha Middle School. Studying independently, he spent much time in Changsha's library, reading core works of classical liberalism such as Adam Smith's The Wealth of Nations and Montesquieu's The Spirit of the Laws, as well as the works of western scientists and philosophers such as Darwin, Mill, Rousseau, and Spencer. Viewing himself as an intellectual, years later he admitted that at this time he thought himself better than working people. He was inspired by Friedrich Paulsen, a neo-Kantian philosopher and educator whose emphasis on the achievement of a carefully defined goal as the highest value led Mao to believe that strong individuals were not bound by moral codes but should strive for a great goal. His father saw no use in his son's intellectual pursuits, cut off his allowance and forced him to move into a hostel for the destitute.

Mao desired to become a teacher and enrolled at the Fourth Normal School of Changsha, which soon merged with the First Normal School of Hunan, widely seen as the best in Hunan. Befriending Mao, professor Yang Changji urged him to read a radical newspaper, New Youth (Xin qingnian), the creation of his friend Chen Duxiu, a dean at Peking University. Although he was a supporter of Chinese nationalism, Chen argued that China must look to the west to cleanse itself of superstition and autocracy.
In his first school year, Mao befriended an older student, Xiao Zisheng; together they went on a walking tour of Hunan, begging and writing literary couplets to obtain food.

A popular student, in 1915 Mao was elected secretary of the Students Society. He organised the Association for Student Self-Government and led protests against school rules. Mao published his first article in New Youth in April 1917, instructing readers to increase their physical strength to serve the revolution. He joined the Society for the Study of Wang Fuzhi (Chuan-shan Hsüeh-she), a revolutionary group founded by Changsha literati who wished to emulate the philosopher Wang Fuzhi. In spring 1917, he was elected to command the students' volunteer army, set up to defend the school from marauding soldiers. Increasingly interested in the techniques of war, he took a keen interest in World War I, and also began to develop a sense of solidarity with workers. Mao undertook feats of physical endurance with Xiao Zisheng and Cai Hesen, and with other young revolutionaries they formed the Renovation of the People Study Society in April 1918 to debate Chen Duxiu's ideas. Desiring personal and societal transformation, the Society gained 70–80 members, many of whom would later join the Communist Party. Mao graduated in June 1919, ranked third in the year.

Early revolutionary activity

Beijing, anarchism, and Marxism: 1917–1919
Mao moved to Beijing, where his mentor Yang Changji had taken a job at Peking University. Yang thought Mao exceptionally "intelligent and handsome", securing him a job as assistant to the university librarian Li Dazhao, who would become an early Chinese Communist. Li authored a series of New Youth articles on the October Revolution in Russia, during which the Communist Bolshevik Party under the leadership of Vladimir Lenin had seized power. Lenin was an advocate of the socio-political theory of Marxism, first developed by the German sociologists Karl Marx and Friedrich Engels, and Li's articles added Marxism to the doctrines in Chinese revolutionary movement.

Becoming "more and more radical", Mao was initially influenced by Peter Kropotkin's anarchism, which was the most prominent radical doctrine of the day. Chinese anarchists, such as Cai Yuanpei, Chancellor of Peking University, called for complete social revolution in social relations, family structure, and women's equality, rather than the simple change in the form of government called for by earlier revolutionaries. He joined Li's Study Group and "developed rapidly toward Marxism" during the winter of 1919. Paid a low wage, Mao lived in a cramped room with seven other Hunanese students, but believed that Beijing's beauty offered "vivid and living compensation". A number of his friends took advantage of the anarchist-organised Mouvement Travail-Études to study in France, but Mao declined, perhaps because of an inability to learn languages.

At the university, Mao was snubbed by other students due to his rural Hunanese accent and lowly position. He joined the university's Philosophy and Journalism Societies and attended lectures and seminars by the likes of Chen Duxiu, Hu Shih, and Qian Xuantong. Mao's time in Beijing ended in the spring of 1919, when he travelled to Shanghai with friends who were preparing to leave for France. He did not return to Shaoshan, where his mother was terminally ill. She died in October 1919 and her husband died in January 1920.

New Culture and political protests: 1919–1920
On 4 May 1919, students in Beijing gathered at the Tiananmen to protest the Chinese government's weak resistance to Japanese expansion in China. Patriots were outraged at the influence given to Japan in the Twenty-One Demands in 1915, the complicity of Duan Qirui's Beiyang Government, and the betrayal of China in the Treaty of Versailles, wherein Japan was allowed to receive territories in Shandong which had been surrendered by Germany. These demonstrations ignited the nationwide May Fourth Movement and fuelled the New Culture Movement which blamed China's diplomatic defeats on social and cultural backwardness.

In Changsha, Mao had begun teaching history at the Xiuye Primary School and organising protests against the pro-Duan Governor of Hunan Province, Zhang Jingyao, popularly known as "Zhang the Venomous" due to his corrupt and violent rule. In late May, Mao co-founded the Hunanese Student Association with He Shuheng and Deng Zhongxia, organising a student strike for June and in July 1919 began production of a weekly radical magazine, Xiang River Review. Using vernacular language that would be understandable to the majority of China's populace, he advocated the need for a "Great Union of the Popular Masses", strengthened trade unions able to wage non-violent revolution. His ideas were not Marxist, but heavily influenced by Kropotkin's concept of mutual aid.

Zhang banned the Student Association, but Mao continued publishing after assuming editorship of the liberal magazine New Hunan (Xin Hunan) and offered articles in popular local newspaper Ta Kung Pao. Several of these advocated feminist views, calling for the liberation of women in Chinese society; Mao was influenced by his forced arranged-marriage. In fall 1919, Mao organized a seminar in Changsha studying economic and political issues, as well as ways to unite the people, the feasibility of socialism, and issues regarding Confucianism. During this period, Mao involved himself in political work with manual laborers, setting up night schools and trade unions. In December 1919, Mao helped organise a general strike in Hunan, securing some concessions, but Mao and other student leaders felt threatened by Zhang, and Mao returned to Beijing, visiting the terminally ill Yang Changji. Mao found that his articles had achieved a level of fame among the revolutionary movement, and set about soliciting support in overthrowing Zhang. Coming across newly translated Marxist literature by Thomas Kirkup, Karl Kautsky, and Marx and Engels—notably The Communist Manifesto—he came under their increasing influence, but was still eclectic in his views.

Mao visited Tianjin, Jinan, and Qufu, before moving to Shanghai, where he worked as a laundryman and met Chen Duxiu, noting that Chen's adoption of Marxism "deeply impressed me at what was probably a critical period in my life". In Shanghai, Mao met an old teacher of his, Yi Peiji, a revolutionary and member of the Kuomintang (KMT), or Chinese Nationalist Party, which was gaining increasing support and influence. Yi introduced Mao to General Tan Yankai, a senior KMT member who held the loyalty of troops stationed along the Hunanese border with Guangdong. Tan was plotting to overthrow Zhang, and Mao aided him by organising the Changsha students. In June 1920, Tan led his troops into Changsha, and Zhang fled. In the subsequent reorganisation of the provincial administration, Mao was appointed headmaster of the junior section of the First Normal School. Now receiving a large income, he married Yang Kaihui, daughter of Yang Changji, in the winter of 1920.

Founding the Chinese Communist Party: 1921–1922

The Chinese Communist Party was founded by Chen Duxiu and Li Dazhao in the French concession of Shanghai in 1921 as a study society and informal network. Mao set up a Changsha branch, also establishing a branch of the Socialist Youth Corps and a Cultural Book Society which opened a bookstore to propagate revolutionary literature throughout Hunan. He was involved in the movement for Hunan autonomy, in the hope that a Hunanese constitution would increase civil liberties and make his revolutionary activity easier. When the movement was successful in establishing provincial autonomy under a new warlord, Mao forgot his involvement. By 1921, small Marxist groups existed in Shanghai, Beijing, Changsha, Wuhan, Guangzhou, and Jinan; it was decided to hold a central meeting, which began in Shanghai on 23 July 1921. The first session of the National Congress of the Chinese Communist Party was attended by 13 delegates, Mao included. After the authorities sent a police spy to the congress, the delegates moved to a boat on South Lake near Jiaxing, in Zhejiang, to escape detection. Although Soviet and Comintern delegates attended, the first congress ignored Lenin's advice to accept a temporary alliance between the Communists and the "bourgeois democrats" who also advocated national revolution; instead they stuck to the orthodox Marxist belief that only the urban proletariat could lead a socialist revolution.

Mao was now party secretary for Hunan stationed in Changsha, and to build the party there he followed a variety of tactics. In August 1921, he founded the Self-Study University, through which readers could gain access to revolutionary literature, housed in the premises of the Society for the Study of Wang Fuzhi, a Qing dynasty Hunanese philosopher who had resisted the Manchus. He joined the YMCA Mass Education Movement to fight illiteracy, though he edited the textbooks to include radical sentiments. He continued organising workers to strike against the administration of Hunan Governor Zhao Hengti. Yet labour issues remained central. The successful and famous  (contrary to later Party historians) depended on both "proletarian" and "bourgeois" strategies. Liu Shaoqi and Li Lisan and Mao not only mobilised the miners, but formed schools and cooperatives and engaged local intellectuals, gentry, military officers, merchants, Red Gang dragon heads and even church clergy. Mao's labour organizing work in the Anyuan mines also involved his wife Yang Kaihui, who worked for women's rights, including literacy and educational issues, in the nearby peasant communities. Although Mao and Yang were not the originators of this political organizing method of combining labor organizing among male workers with a focus on women's rights issues in their communities, they were among the most effective at using this method. Mao's political organizing success in the Anyuan mines resulted in Chen Duxiu inviting him to become a member of the Communist Party's Central Committee.

Mao claimed that he missed the July 1922 Second Congress of the Communist Party in Shanghai because he lost the address. Adopting Lenin's advice, the delegates agreed to an alliance with the "bourgeois democrats" of the KMT for the good of the "national revolution". Communist Party members joined the KMT, hoping to push its politics leftward.
Mao enthusiastically agreed with this decision, arguing for an alliance across China's socio-economic classes, and eventually rose to become propaganda chief of the KMT. Mao was a vocal anti-imperialist and in his writings he lambasted the governments of Japan, the UK and US, describing the latter as "the most murderous of hangmen".

Collaboration with the Kuomintang: 1922–1927

At the Third Congress of the Communist Party in Shanghai in June 1923, the delegates reaffirmed their commitment to working with the KMT. Supporting this position, Mao was elected to the Party Committee, taking up residence in Shanghai. At the First KMT Congress, held in Guangzhou in early 1924, Mao was elected an alternate member of the KMT Central Executive Committee, and put forward four resolutions to decentralise power to urban and rural bureaus. His enthusiastic support for the KMT earned him the suspicion of Li Li-san, his Hunan comrade.

In late 1924, Mao returned to Shaoshan, perhaps to recuperate from an illness. He found that the peasantry were increasingly restless and some had seized land from wealthy landowners to found communes. This convinced him of the revolutionary potential of the peasantry, an idea advocated by the KMT leftists but not the Communists. Mao and many of his colleagues also proposed the end of cooperation with the KMT, which was rejected by the Comintern representative Mikhail Borodin.In the winter of 1925, Mao fled to Guangzhou after his revolutionary activities attracted the attention of Zhao's regional authorities. There, he ran the 6th term of the KMT's Peasant Movement Training Institute from May to September 1926. The Peasant Movement Training Institute under Mao trained cadre and prepared them for militant activity, taking them through military training exercises and getting them to study basic left-wing texts.

When party leader Sun Yat-sen died in May 1925, he was succeeded by Chiang Kai-shek, who moved to marginalise the left-KMT and the Communists. Mao nevertheless supported Chiang's National Revolutionary Army, who embarked on the Northern Expedition attack in 1926 on warlords. In the wake of this expedition, peasants rose up, appropriating the land of the wealthy landowners, who were in many cases killed. Such uprisings angered senior KMT figures, who were themselves landowners, emphasising the growing class and ideological divide within the revolutionary movement.

In March 1927, Mao appeared at the Third Plenum of the KMT Central Executive Committee in Wuhan, which sought to strip General Chiang of his power by appointing Wang Jingwei leader. There, Mao played an active role in the discussions regarding the peasant issue, defending a set of "Regulations for the Repression of Local Bullies and Bad Gentry", which advocated the death penalty or life imprisonment for anyone found guilty of counter-revolutionary activity, arguing that in a revolutionary situation, "peaceful methods cannot suffice". In April 1927, Mao was appointed to the KMT's five-member Central Land Committee, urging peasants to refuse to pay rent. Mao led another group to put together a "Draft Resolution on the Land Question", which called for the confiscation of land belonging to "local bullies and bad gentry, corrupt officials, militarists and all counter-revolutionary elements in the villages". Proceeding to carry out a "Land Survey", he stated that anyone owning over 30 mou (four and a half acres), constituting 13% of the population, were uniformly counter-revolutionary. He accepted that there was great variation in revolutionary enthusiasm across the country, and that a flexible policy of land redistribution was necessary. Presenting his conclusions at the Enlarged Land Committee meeting, many expressed reservations, some believing that it went too far, and others not far enough. Ultimately, his suggestions were only partially implemented.

Civil War

Nanchang and Autumn Harvest Uprisings: 1927

Fresh from the success of the Northern Expedition against the warlords, Chiang turned on the Communists, who by now numbered in the tens of thousands across China. Chiang ignored the orders of the Wuhan-based left KMT government and marched on Shanghai, a city controlled by Communist militias. As the Communists awaited Chiang's arrival, he loosed the White Terror, massacring 5000 with the aid of the Green Gang. In Beijing, 19 leading Communists were killed by Zhang Zuolin.

The CCP continued supporting the Wuhan KMT government, a position Mao initially supported, but by the time of the CCP's Fifth Congress he had changed his mind, deciding to stake all hope on the peasant militia. The question was rendered moot when the Wuhan government expelled all Communists from the KMT on 15 July. The CCP founded the Workers' and Peasants' Red Army of China, better known as the "Red Army", to battle Chiang. A battalion led by General Zhu De was ordered to take the city of Nanchang on 1 August 1927, in what became known as the Nanchang Uprising. They were initially successful, but were forced into retreat after five days, marching south to Shantou, and from there they were driven into the wilderness of Fujian. Mao was appointed commander-in-chief of the Red Army and led four regiments against Changsha in the Autumn Harvest Uprising, in the hope of sparking peasant uprisings across Hunan. On the eve of the attack, Mao composed a poem—the earliest of his to survive—titled "Changsha". His plan was to attack the KMT-held city from three directions on 9 September, but the Fourth Regiment deserted to the KMT cause, attacking the Third Regiment. Mao's army made it to Changsha, but could not take it; by 15 September, he accepted defeat and with 1000 survivors marched east to the Jinggang Mountains of Jiangxi.

Base in Jinggangshan: 1927–1928

The CCP Central Committee, hiding in Shanghai, expelled Mao from their ranks and from the Hunan Provincial Committee, as punishment for his "military opportunism", for his focus on rural activity, and for being too lenient with "bad gentry". The more orthodox Communists especially regarded the peasants as backward and ridiculed Mao's idea of mobilizing them. They nevertheless adopted three policies he had long championed: the immediate formation of Workers' councils, the confiscation of all land without exemption, and the rejection of the KMT. Mao's response was to ignore them. He established a base in Jinggangshan City, an area of the Jinggang Mountains, where he united five villages as a self-governing state, and supported the confiscation of land from rich landlords, who were "re-educated" and sometimes executed. He ensured that no massacres took place in the region, and pursued a more lenient approach than that advocated by the Central Committee. In addition to land redistribution, Mao promoted literacy and non-hierarchical organizational relationships in Jinggangshan, transforming the area's social and economic life and attracted many local supporters.

Mao proclaimed that "Even the lame, the deaf and the blind could all come in useful for the revolutionary struggle", he boosted the army's numbers, incorporating two groups of bandits into his army, building a force of around  troops. He laid down rules for his soldiers: prompt obedience to orders, all confiscations were to be turned over to the government, and nothing was to be confiscated from poorer peasants. In doing so, he moulded his men into a disciplined, efficient fighting force.

In spring 1928, the Central Committee ordered Mao's troops to southern Hunan, hoping to spark peasant uprisings. Mao was skeptical, but complied. They reached Hunan, where they were attacked by the KMT and fled after heavy losses. Meanwhile, KMT troops had invaded Jinggangshan, leaving them without a base. Wandering the countryside, Mao's forces came across a CCP regiment led by General Zhu De and Lin Biao; they united, and attempted to retake Jinggangshan. They were initially successful, but the KMT counter-attacked, and pushed the CCP back; over the next few weeks, they fought an entrenched guerrilla war in the mountains. The Central Committee again ordered Mao to march to south Hunan, but he refused, and remained at his base. Contrastingly, Zhu complied, and led his armies away. Mao's troops fended the KMT off for 25 days while he left the camp at night to find reinforcements. He reunited with the decimated Zhu's army, and together they returned to Jinggangshan and retook the base. There they were joined by a defecting KMT regiment and Peng Dehuai's Fifth Red Army. In the mountainous area they were unable to grow enough crops to feed everyone, leading to food shortages throughout the winter.

In 1928, Mao met and married He Zizhen, an 18-year-old revolutionary who would bear him six children.

Jiangxi Soviet Republic of China: 1929–1934

In January 1929, Mao and Zhu evacuated the base with 2,000 men and a further 800 provided by Peng, and took their armies south, to the area around Tonggu and Xinfeng in Jiangxi. The evacuation led to a drop in morale, and many troops became disobedient and began thieving; this worried Li Lisan and the Central Committee, who saw Mao's army as lumpenproletariat, that were unable to share in proletariat class consciousness. In keeping with orthodox Marxist thought, Li believed that only the urban proletariat could lead a successful revolution, and saw little need for Mao's peasant guerrillas; he ordered Mao to disband his army into units to be sent out to spread the revolutionary message. Mao replied that while he concurred with Li's theoretical position, he would not disband his army nor abandon his base. Both Li and Mao saw the Chinese revolution as the key to world revolution, believing that a CCP victory would spark the overthrow of global imperialism and capitalism. In this, they disagreed with the official line of the Soviet government and Comintern. Officials in Moscow desired greater control over the CCP and removed Li from power by calling him to Russia for an inquest into his errors. They replaced him with Soviet-educated Chinese Communists, known as the "28 Bolsheviks", two of whom, Bo Gu and Zhang Wentian, took control of the Central Committee. Mao disagreed with the new leadership, believing they grasped little of the Chinese situation, and he soon emerged as their key rival.

In February 1930, Mao created the Southwest Jiangxi Provincial Soviet Government in the region under his control. In November, he suffered emotional trauma after his second wife Yang Kaihui and sister were captured and beheaded by KMT general He Jian. Facing internal problems, members of the Jiangxi Soviet accused him of being too moderate, and hence anti-revolutionary. In December, they tried to overthrow Mao, resulting in the Futian incident, during which Mao's loyalists tortured many and executed between 2000 and 3000 dissenters. The CCP Central Committee moved to Jiangxi which it saw as a secure area. In November, it proclaimed Jiangxi to be the Soviet Republic of China, an independent Communist-governed state. Although he was proclaimed Chairman of the Council of People's Commissars, Mao's power was diminished, as his control of the Red Army was allocated to Zhou Enlai. Meanwhile, Mao recovered from tuberculosis.

The KMT armies adopted a policy of encirclement and annihilation of the Red armies. Outnumbered, Mao responded with guerrilla tactics influenced by the works of ancient military strategists like Sun Tzu, but Zhou and the new leadership followed a policy of open confrontation and conventional warfare. In doing so, the Red Army successfully defeated the first and second encirclements. Angered at his armies' failure, Chiang Kai-shek personally arrived to lead the operation. He too faced setbacks and retreated to deal with the further Japanese incursions into China. As a result of the KMT's change of focus to the defence of China against Japanese expansionism, the Red Army was able to expand its area of control, eventually encompassing a population of 3 million. Mao proceeded with his land reform program. In November 1931 he announced the start of a "land verification project" which was expanded in June 1933. He also orchestrated education programs and implemented measures to increase female political participation. Chiang viewed the Communists as a greater threat than the Japanese and returned to Jiangxi, where he initiated the fifth encirclement campaign, which involved the construction of a concrete and barbed wire "wall of fire" around the state, which was accompanied by aerial bombardment, to which Zhou's tactics proved ineffective. Trapped inside, morale among the Red Army dropped as food and medicine became scarce. The leadership decided to evacuate.

Long March: 1934–1935

On 14 October 1934, the Red Army broke through the KMT line on the Jiangxi Soviet's south-west corner at Xinfeng with  soldiers and  party cadres and embarked on the "Long March". In order to make the escape, many of the wounded and the ill, as well as women and children, were left behind, defended by a group of guerrilla fighters whom the KMT massacred. The  who escaped headed to southern Hunan, first crossing the Xiang River after heavy fighting, and then the Wu River, in Guizhou where they took Zunyi in January 1935. Temporarily resting in the city, they held a conference; here, Mao was elected to a position of leadership, becoming Chairman of the Politburo, and de facto leader of both Party and Red Army, in part because his candidacy was supported by Soviet Premier Joseph Stalin. Insisting that they operate as a guerrilla force, he laid out a destination: the Shenshi Soviet in Shaanxi, Northern China, from where the Communists could focus on fighting the Japanese. Mao believed that in focusing on the anti-imperialist struggle, the Communists would earn the trust of the Chinese people, who in turn would renounce the KMT.

From Zunyi, Mao led his troops to Loushan Pass, where they faced armed opposition but successfully crossed the river. Chiang flew into the area to lead his armies against Mao, but the Communists outmanoeuvred him and crossed the Jinsha River. Faced with the more difficult task of crossing the Tatu River, they managed it by fighting a battle over the Luding Bridge in May, taking Luding. Marching through the mountain ranges around Ma'anshan, in Moukung, Western Sichuan, they encountered the -strong CCP Fourth Front Army of Zhang Guotao, and together proceeded to Maoerhkai and then Gansu. Zhang and Mao disagreed over what to do; the latter wished to proceed to Shaanxi, while Zhang wanted to retreat east to Tibet or Sikkim, far from the KMT threat. It was agreed that they would go their separate ways, with Zhu De joining Zhang. Mao's forces proceeded north, through hundreds of kilometres of Grasslands, an area of quagmire where they were attacked by Manchu tribesman and where many soldiers succumbed to famine and disease. Finally reaching Shaanxi, they fought off both the KMT and an Islamic cavalry militia before crossing the Min Mountains and Mount Liupan and reaching the Shenshi Soviet; only 7,000–8000 had survived. The Long March cemented Mao's status as the dominant figure in the party. In November 1935, he was named chairman of the Military Commission. From this point onward, Mao was the Communist Party's undisputed leader, even though he would not become party chairman until 1943.

Alliance with the Kuomintang: 1935–1940

Mao's troops arrived at the Yan'an Soviet during October 1935 and settled in Pao An, until spring 1936. While there, they developed links with local communities, redistributed and farmed the land, offered medical treatment, and began literacy programs. Mao now commanded  soldiers, boosted by the arrival of He Long's men from Hunan and the armies of Zhu De and Zhang Guotao returned from Tibet. In February 1936, they established the North West Anti-Japanese Red Army University in Yan'an, through which they trained increasing numbers of new recruits. In January 1937, they began the "anti-Japanese expedition", that sent groups of guerrilla fighters into Japanese-controlled territory to undertake sporadic attacks. In May 1937, a Communist Conference was held in Yan'an to discuss the situation. Western reporters also arrived in the "Border Region" (as the Soviet had been renamed); most notable were Edgar Snow, who used his experiences as a basis for Red Star Over China, and Agnes Smedley, whose accounts brought international attention to Mao's cause.

On the Long March, Mao's wife He Zizen had been injured by a shrapnel wound to the head. She travelled to Moscow for medical treatment; Mao proceeded to divorce her and marry an actress, Jiang Qing. He Zizhen was reportedly "dispatched to a mental asylum in Moscow to make room" for Qing. Mao moved into a cave-house and spent much of his time reading, tending his garden and theorising. He came to believe that the Red Army alone was unable to defeat the Japanese, and that a Communist-led "government of national defence" should be formed with the KMT and other "bourgeois nationalist" elements to achieve this goal. Although despising Chiang Kai-shek as a "traitor to the nation", on 5 May, he telegrammed the Military Council of the Nanking National Government proposing a military alliance, a course of action advocated by Stalin. Although Chiang intended to ignore Mao's message and continue the civil war, he was arrested by one of his own generals, Zhang Xueliang, in Xi'an, leading to the Xi'an Incident; Zhang forced Chiang to discuss the issue with the Communists, resulting in the formation of a United Front with concessions on both sides on 25 December 1937.

The Japanese had taken both Shanghai and Nanking (Nanjing)—resulting in the Nanking Massacre, an atrocity Mao never spoke of all his life—and was pushing the Kuomintang government inland to Chungking. In August 1938, the Red Army formed the New Fourth Army and the Eighth Route Army, which were nominally under the command of Chiang's National Revolutionary Army. In August 1940, the Red Army initiated the Hundred Regiments Campaign, in which  troops attacked the Japanese simultaneously in five provinces. It was a military success that resulted in the death of  Japanese, the disruption of railways and the loss of a coal mine. From his base in Yan'an, Mao authored several texts for his troops, including Philosophy of Revolution, which offered an introduction to the Marxist theory of knowledge; Protracted Warfare, which dealt with guerrilla and mobile military tactics; and New Democracy, which laid forward ideas for China's future.

Resuming civil war: 1940–1949
In 1944, the U.S. sent a special diplomatic envoy, called the Dixie Mission, to the Chinese Communist Party. The American soldiers who were sent to the mission were favourably impressed. The party seemed less corrupt, more unified, and more vigorous in its resistance to Japan than the Kuomintang. The soldiers confirmed to their superiors that the party was both strong and popular over a broad area. In the end of the mission, the contacts which the U.S. developed with the Chinese Communist Party led to very little. After the end of World War II, the U.S. continued their diplomatic and military assistance to Chiang Kai-shek and his KMT government forces against the People's Liberation Army (PLA) led by Mao Zedong during the civil war and abandoned the idea of a coalition government which would include the CCP. Likewise, the Soviet Union gave support to Mao by occupying north-eastern China, and secretly giving it to the Chinese communists in March 1946.

In 1948, under direct orders from Mao, the People's Liberation Army starved out the Kuomintang forces occupying the city of Changchun. At least  civilians are believed to have perished during the siege, which lasted from June until October. PLA lieutenant colonel Zhang Zhenglu, who documented the siege in his book White Snow, Red Blood, compared it to Hiroshima: "The casualties were about the same. Hiroshima took nine seconds; Changchun took five months." On 21 January 1949, Kuomintang forces suffered great losses in decisive battles against Mao's forces. In the early morning of 10 December 1949, PLA troops laid siege to Chongqing and Chengdu on mainland China, and Chiang Kai-shek fled from the mainland to Formosa (Taiwan).

Leadership of China

Mao proclaimed the establishment of the People's Republic of China from the Gate of Heavenly Peace (Tian'anmen) on 1 October 1949, and later that week declared "The Chinese people have stood up". Mao went to Moscow for long talks in the winter of 1949–50. Mao initiated the talks which focused on the political and economic revolution in China, foreign policy, railways, naval bases, and Soviet economic and technical aid. The resulting treaty reflected Stalin's dominance and his willingness to help Mao.

Mao's views as a Marxist were strongly influenced by Lenin, particularly with regard to the vanguardism. Mao believed that only the correct leadership of the Communist Party could advance China into socialism. Conversely, Mao also believed that mass movements and mass criticism were necessary in order to check the bureaucracy.

Mao pushed the Party to organise campaigns to reform society and extend control. These campaigns were given urgency in October 1950, when Mao made the decision to send the People's Volunteer Army, a special unit of the People's Liberation Army, into the Korean War and fight as well as to reinforce the armed forces of North Korea, the Korean People's Army, which had been in full retreat. The United States placed a trade embargo on the People's Republic as a result of its involvement in the Korean War, lasting until Richard Nixon's improvements of relations. At least 180 thousand Chinese troops died during the war.

Mao directed operations to the minutest detail. As the Chairman of the Central Military Commission (CMC), he was also the Supreme Commander in Chief of the PLA and the People's Republic and Chairman of the Party. Chinese troops in Korea were under the overall command of then newly installed Premier Zhou Enlai, with General Peng Dehuai as field commander and political commissar.

During the land reform campaigns, large numbers of landlords and rich peasants were beaten to death at mass meetings organised by the Communist Party as land was taken from them and given to poorer peasants, which significantly reduced economic inequality. The Campaign to Suppress Counter-revolutionaries targeted bureaucratic burgeoisie, such as compradores, merchants and Kuomintang officials who were seen by the party as economic parasites or political enemies. In 1976, the U.S. State department estimated as many as a million were killed in the land reform, and  killed in the counter-revolutionary campaign.

Mao himself claimed that a total of  people were killed in attacks on "counter-revolutionaries" during the years 1950–1952. Because there was a policy to select "at least one landlord, and usually several, in virtually every village for public execution", the number of deaths range between 2 million and 5 million. In addition, at least 1.5 million people, perhaps as many as 4 to 6 million, were sent to "reform through labour" camps where many perished. Mao played a personal role in organising the mass repressions and established a system of execution quotas, which were often exceeded. He defended these killings as necessary for the securing of power.

The Mao government is credited with eradicating both consumption and production of opium during the 1950s using unrestrained repression and social reform. Ten million addicts were forced into compulsory treatment, dealers were executed, and opium-producing regions were planted with new crops. Remaining opium production shifted south of the Chinese border into the Golden Triangle region.

Starting in 1951, Mao initiated two successive movements in an effort to rid urban areas of corruption by targeting wealthy capitalists and political opponents, known as the three-anti/five-anti campaigns. Whereas the three-anti campaign was a focused purge of government, industrial and party officials, the five-anti campaign set its sights slightly broader, targeting capitalist elements in general. Workers denounced their bosses, spouses turned on their spouses, and children informed on their parents; the victims were often humiliated at struggle sessions, where a targeted person would be verbally and physically abused until they confessed to crimes. Mao insisted that minor offenders be criticised and reformed or sent to labour camps, "while the worst among them should be shot". These campaigns took several hundred thousand additional lives, the vast majority via suicide.

In Shanghai, suicide by jumping from tall buildings became so commonplace that residents avoided walking on the pavement near skyscrapers for fear that suicides might land on them. Some biographers have pointed out that driving those perceived as enemies to suicide was a common tactic during the Mao-era. In his biography of Mao, Philip Short notes that Mao gave explicit instructions in the Yan'an Rectification Movement that "no cadre is to be killed" but in practice allowed security chief Kang Sheng to drive opponents to suicide and that "this pattern was repeated throughout his leadership of the People's Republic".

Following the consolidation of power, Mao launched the First Five-Year Plan (1953–1958), which emphasised rapid industrial development. Within industry, iron and steel, electric power, coal, heavy engineering, building materials, and basic chemicals were prioritised with the aim of constructing large and highly capital-intensive plants. Many of these plants were built with Soviet assistance and heavy industry grew rapidly. Agriculture, industry and trade was organised on a collective basis (socialist cooperatives). This period marked the beginning of China's rapid industrialisation and it resulted in an enormous success.

Despite being initially sympathetic towards the reformist government of Imre Nagy, Mao feared the "reactionary restoration" in Hungary as the Hungarian crisis continued and became more hardline. Mao opposed the withdrawal of Soviet troops by asking Liu Shaoqi to inform the Soviet representatives to maintain a hardline stance against "western imperialist-backed" protestors and Nagy's government. However, it was unclear if Mao's stance played a crucial role, if any role, in Khrushchev's decision to invade Hungary. It was also unclear if China was forced to conform to the Soviet position due to economic concerns and China's poor power projections compared to the USSR. Despite his disagreements with Moscow's hegemony in the Socialist Camp, Mao viewed the integrity of the international communist movement as more important than the national autonomy of the countries in the Soviet sphere of influence. The Hungarian Revolution also influenced Mao's Hundred Flowers Campaign. Mao decided to soften his stance on Chinese intelligentsia and allow them to express their social dissatisfaction and criticisms of the errors of the government. Mao wanted to use this movement to prevent a similar uprising in China.

Programs pursued during this time include the Hundred Flowers Campaign, in which Mao indicated his supposed willingness to consider different opinions about how China should be governed. Given the freedom to express themselves, liberal and intellectual Chinese began opposing the Communist Party and questioning its leadership. This was initially tolerated and encouraged. After a few months, Mao's government reversed its policy and persecuted those who had criticised the party, totalling perhaps , as well as those who were merely alleged to have been critical, in what is called the Anti-Rightist Movement.

Li Zhisui, Mao's physician, suggested that Mao had initially seen the policy as a way of weakening opposition to him within the party and that he was surprised by the extent of criticism and the fact that it came to be directed at his own leadership.

Great Leap Forward

In January 1958, Mao launched the second Five-Year Plan, known as the Great Leap Forward, a plan intended to turn China from an agrarian nation to an industrialised one and as an alternative model for economic growth to the Soviet model focusing on heavy industry that was advocated by others in the party. Under this economic program, the relatively small agricultural collectives that had been formed to date were rapidly merged into far larger people's communes, and many of the peasants were ordered to work on massive infrastructure projects and on the production of iron and steel. Some private food production was banned, and livestock and farm implements were brought under collective ownership.

Under the Great Leap Forward, Mao and other party leaders ordered the implementation of a variety of unproven and unscientific new agricultural techniques by the new communes. The combined effect of the diversion of labour to steel production and infrastructure projects, and cyclical natural disasters led to an approximately 15% drop in grain production in 1959 followed by a further 10% decline in 1960 and no recovery in 1961.

In an effort to win favour with their superiors and avoid being purged, each layer in the party exaggerated the amount of grain produced under them. Based upon the falsely reported success, party cadres were ordered to requisition a disproportionately high amount of that fictitious harvest for state use, primarily for use in the cities and urban areas but also for export. The result, compounded in some areas by drought and in others by floods, was that farmers were left with little food for themselves and many millions starved to death in the Great Chinese Famine. The people of urban areas in China were given food stamps each month, but the people of rural areas were expected to grow their own crops and give some of the crops back to the government. The death count in rural parts of China surpassed the deaths in the urban centers. Additionally, the Chinese government continued to export food that could have been allocated to the country's starving citizens. The famine was a direct cause of the death of some 30 million Chinese peasants between 1959 and 1962. Furthermore, many children who became malnourished during years of hardship died after the Great Leap Forward came to an end in 1962.

In late autumn 1958, Mao condemned the practices that were being used during Great Leap Forward such as forcing peasants to do exhausting labour without enough food or rest which resulted in epidemics and starvation. He also acknowledged that anti-rightist campaigns were a major cause of "production at the expense of livelihood." He refused to abandon the Great Leap Forward to solve these difficulties, but he did demand that they be confronted. After the July 1959 clash at Lushan Conference with Peng Dehuai, Mao launched a new anti-rightist campaign along with the radical policies that he previously abandoned. It wasn't until the spring of 1960, that Mao would again express concern about abnormal deaths and other abuses, but he did not move to stop them. Bernstein concludes that the Chairman "wilfully ignored the lessons of the first radical phase for the sake of achieving extreme ideological and developmental goals".

Jasper Becker notes that Mao was dismissive of reports he received of food shortages in the countryside and refused to change course, believing that peasants were lying and that rightists and kulaks were hoarding grain. He refused to open state granaries, and instead launched a series of "anti-grain concealment" drives that resulted in numerous purges and suicides. Other violent campaigns followed in which party leaders went from village to village in search of hidden food reserves, and not only grain, as Mao issued quotas for pigs, chickens, ducks and eggs. Many peasants accused of hiding food were tortured and beaten to death.

The extent of Mao's knowledge of the severity of the situation has been disputed. Mao's personal physician, Li Zhisui, said that Mao may have been unaware of the extent of the famine, partly due to a reluctance of local officials to criticise his policies, and the willingness of his staff to exaggerate or outright fake reports. Li writes that upon learning of the extent of the starvation, Mao vowed to stop eating meat, an action followed by his staff.

Mao stepped down as President of China on 27 April 1959; however, he retained other top positions such as Chairman of the Communist Party and of the Central Military Commission. The Presidency was transferred to Liu Shaoqi. He was eventually forced to abandon the policy in 1962, and he lost political power to Liu Shaoqi and Deng Xiaoping.

The Great Leap Forward was a tragedy for the vast majority of the Chinese. Although the steel quotas were officially reached, almost all of the supposed steel made in the countryside was iron, as it had been made from assorted scrap metal in home-made furnaces with no reliable source of fuel such as coal. This meant that proper smelting conditions could not be achieved. According to Zhang Rongmei, a geometry teacher in rural Shanghai during the Great Leap Forward: "We took all the furniture, pots, and pans we had in our house, and all our neighbours did likewise. We put everything in a big fire and melted down all the metal". The worst of the famine was steered towards enemies of the state. Jasper Becker explains: "The most vulnerable section of China's population, around five percent, were those whom Mao called 'enemies of the people'. Anyone who had in previous campaigns of repression been labeled a 'black element' was given the lowest priority in the allocation of food. Landlords, rich peasants, former members of the nationalist regime, religious leaders, rightists, counter-revolutionaries and the families of such individuals died in the greatest numbers."

According to official Chinese statistics for Second Five-Year Plan (1958–1962):"industrial output value value had doubled; the gross value of agricultural products increased by 35 percent; steel production in 1962 was between 10.6 million tons or 12 million tons; investment in capital construction rose to 40 percent from 35 percent in the First Five-Year Plan period; the investment in capital construction was doubled; and the average income of workers and farmers increased by up to 30 percent."

At a large Communist Party conference in Beijing in January 1962, dubbed the "Seven Thousand Cadres Conference", State Chairman Liu Shaoqi denounced the Great Leap Forward, attributing the project to widespread famine in China. The overwhelming majority of delegates expressed agreement, but Defense Minister Lin Biao staunchly defended Mao. A brief period of liberalisation followed while Mao and Lin plotted a comeback. Liu Shaoqi and Deng Xiaoping rescued the economy by disbanding the people's communes, introducing elements of private control of peasant smallholdings and importing grain from Canada and Australia to mitigate the worst effects of famine.

Consequences

At the Lushan Conference in July/August 1959, several ministers expressed concern that the Great Leap Forward had not proved as successful as planned. The most direct of these was Minister of Defence and Korean War veteran General Peng Dehuai. Following Peng's criticism of the Great Leap Forward, Mao orchestrated a purge of Peng and his supporters, stifling criticism of the Great Leap policies. Senior officials who reported the truth of the famine to Mao were branded as "right opportunists." A campaign against right-wing opportunism was launched and resulted in party members and ordinary peasants being sent to prison labour camps where many would subsequently die in the famine. Years later the CCP would conclude that as many as six million people were wrongly punished in the campaign.

The number of deaths by starvation during the Great Leap Forward is deeply controversial. Until the mid-1980s, when official census figures were finally published by the Chinese Government, little was known about the scale of the disaster in the Chinese countryside, as the handful of Western observers allowed access during this time had been restricted to model villages where they were deceived into believing that the Great Leap Forward had been a great success. There was also an assumption that the flow of individual reports of starvation that had been reaching the West, primarily through Hong Kong and Taiwan, must have been localised or exaggerated as China was continuing to claim record harvests and was a net exporter of grain through the period. Because Mao wanted to pay back early to the Soviets debts totalling 1.973 billion yuan from 1960 to 1962, exports increased by 50%, and fellow Communist regimes in North Korea, North Vietnam and Albania were provided grain free of charge.

Censuses were carried out in China in 1953, 1964 and 1982. The first attempt to analyse this data to estimate the number of famine deaths was carried out by American demographer Dr. Judith Banister and published in 1984. Given the lengthy gaps between the censuses and doubts over the reliability of the data, an accurate figure is difficult to ascertain. Nevertheless, Banister concluded that the official data implied that around 15 million excess deaths incurred in China during 1958–61, and that based on her modelling of Chinese demographics during the period and taking account of assumed under-reporting during the famine years, the figure was around 30 million. Hu Yaobang, a high-ranking official of the CCP, states that 20 million people died according to official government statistics. Yang Jisheng, a former Xinhua News Agency reporter who had privileged access and connections available to no other scholars, estimates a death toll of 36 million. Frank Dikötter estimates that there were at least 45 million premature deaths attributable to the Great Leap Forward from 1958 to 1962. Various other sources have put the figure at between 20 and 46 million.

Split from Soviet Union

On the international front, the period was dominated by the further isolation of China. The Sino-Soviet split resulted in Nikita Khrushchev's withdrawal of all Soviet technical experts and aid from the country. The split concerned the leadership of world communism. The USSR had a network of Communist parties it supported; China now created its own rival network to battle it out for local control of the left in numerous countries. Lorenz M. Lüthi writes: "The Sino-Soviet split was one of the key events of the Cold War, equal in importance to the construction of the Berlin Wall, the Cuban Missile Crisis, the Second Vietnam War, and Sino-American rapprochement. The split helped to determine the framework of the Second Cold War in general, and influenced the course of the Second Vietnam War in particular."

The split resulted from Khrushchev's more moderate Soviet leadership after the death of Stalin in March 1953. Only Albania openly sided with China, thereby forming an alliance between the two countries which would last until after Mao's death in 1976. Warned that the Soviets had nuclear weapons, Mao minimised the threat. Becker says that "Mao believed that the bomb was a 'paper tiger', declaring to Khrushchev that it would not matter if China lost 300 million people in a nuclear war: the other half of the population would survive to ensure victory". Struggle against Soviet revisionism and U.S. imperialism was an important aspect of Mao's attempt to direct the revolution in the right direction.

According to historian Mingjiang Li, Mao deliberately escalated Sino-Soviet diplomatic tensions as part of his attempt to reassert his domestic political power and limit that of his rivals by showcasing his commitment to revolution and his hardline stance against what he deemed Soviet revisionism.

Great Proletarian Cultural Revolution

During the early 1960s, Mao became concerned with the nature of post-1959 China. He saw that the revolution and Great Leap Forward had replaced the old ruling elite with a new one. He was concerned that those in power were becoming estranged from the people they were to serve. Mao believed that a revolution of culture would unseat and unsettle the "ruling class" and keep China in a state of "continuous revolution" that, theoretically, would serve the interests of the majority, rather than a tiny and privileged elite. State Chairman Liu Shaoqi and General Secretary Deng Xiaoping favoured the idea that Mao be removed from actual power as China's head of state and government but maintain his ceremonial and symbolic role as Chairman of the Chinese Communist Party, with the party upholding all of his positive contributions to the revolution. They attempted to marginalise Mao by taking control of economic policy and asserting themselves politically as well. Many claim that Mao responded to Liu and Deng's movements by launching the Great Proletarian Cultural Revolution in 1966. Some scholars, such as Mobo Gao, claim the case for this is overstated. Others, such as Frank Dikötter, hold that Mao launched the Cultural Revolution to wreak revenge on those who had dared to challenge him over the Great Leap Forward.

The Cultural Revolution led to the destruction of much of China's traditional cultural heritage and the imprisonment of a huge number of Chinese citizens, as well as the creation of general economic and social chaos in the country. Millions of lives were ruined during this period, as the Cultural Revolution pierced into every part of Chinese life, depicted by such Chinese films as To Live, The Blue Kite and Farewell My Concubine. It is estimated that hundreds of thousands of people, perhaps millions, perished in the violence of the Cultural Revolution. This included prominent figures such as Liu Shaoqi.

When Mao was informed of such losses, particularly that people had been driven to suicide, he is alleged to have commented: "People who try to commit suicide—don't attempt to save them! ... China is such a populous nation, it is not as if we cannot do without a few people." The authorities allowed the Red Guards to abuse and kill opponents of the regime. Said Xie Fuzhi, national police chief: "Don't say it is wrong of them to beat up bad persons: if in anger they beat someone to death, then so be it." In August and September 1966, there were a reported 1,772 people murdered by the Red Guards in Beijing alone.

It was during this period that Mao chose Lin Biao, who seemed to echo all of Mao's ideas, to become his successor. Lin was later officially named as Mao's successor. By 1971, a divide between the two men had become apparent. Official history in China states that Lin was planning a military coup or an assassination attempt on Mao. Lin Biao died on 13 September 1971, in a plane crash over the air space of Mongolia, presumably as he fled China, probably anticipating his arrest. The CCP declared that Lin was planning to depose Mao and posthumously expelled Lin from the party. At this time, Mao lost trust in many of the top CCP figures. The highest-ranking Soviet Bloc intelligence defector, Lt. Gen. Ion Mihai Pacepa claimed he had a conversation with Nicolae Ceaușescu, who told him about a plot to kill Mao Zedong with the help of Lin Biao organised by the KGB.

Despite being considered a feminist figure by some and a supporter of women's rights, documents released by the US Department of State in 2008 show that Mao declared women to be a "nonsense" in 1973, in conversation with Henry Kissinger, joking that "China is a very poor country. We don't have much. What we have in excess is women. ... Let them go to your place. They will create disasters. That way you can lessen our burdens." When Mao offered 10 million women, Kissinger replied by saying that Mao was "improving his offer". Mao and Kissinger then agreed that their comments on women be removed from public records, prompted by a Chinese official who feared that Mao's comments might incur public anger if released.

In 1969, Mao declared the Cultural Revolution to be over, although various historians in and outside of China mark the end of the Cultural Revolution—as a whole or in part—in 1976, following Mao's death and the arrest of the Gang of Four. The Central Committee in 1981 officially declared the Cultural Revolution a "severe setback" for the PRC. It is often looked at in all scholarly circles as a greatly disruptive period for China. Despite the pro-poor rhetoric of Mao's regime, his economic policies led to substantial poverty. 

Estimates of the death toll during the Cultural Revolution, including civilians and Red Guards, vary greatly. An estimate of around 400,000 deaths is a widely accepted minimum figure, according to Maurice Meisner. MacFarquhar and Schoenhals assert that in rural China alone some 36 million people were persecuted, of whom between 750,000 and 1.5 million were killed, with roughly the same number permanently injured.

Historian Daniel Leese writes that in the 1950s, Mao's personality was hardening: "The impression of Mao's personality that emerges from the literature is disturbing. It reveals a certain temporal development from a down-to-earth leader, who was amicable when uncontested and occasionally reflected on the limits of his power, to an increasingly ruthless and self-indulgent dictator. Mao's preparedness to accept criticism decreased continuously."

State visits

During his leadership, Mao travelled outside China on only two occasions, both state visits to the Soviet Union. His first visit abroad was to celebrate the 70th birthday of Soviet leader Joseph Stalin, which was also attended by East German Deputy Chairman of the Council of Ministers Walter Ulbricht and Mongolian communist General Secretary Yumjaagiin Tsedenbal. The second visit to Moscow was a two-week state visit of which the highlights included Mao's attendance at the 40th anniversary (Ruby Jubilee) celebrations of the October Revolution (he attended the annual military parade of the Moscow Garrison on Red Square as well as a banquet in the Moscow Kremlin) and the International Meeting of Communist and Workers Parties, where he met with other communist leaders such as North Korea's Kim Il-Sung and Albania's Enver Hoxha. When Mao stepped down as head of state on 27 April 1959, further diplomatic state visits and travels abroad were undertaken by President Liu Shaoqi, Premier Zhou Enlai and Deputy Premier Deng Xiaoping rather than Mao personally.

Death and aftermath

Mao's health declined in his last years, probably aggravated by his chain-smoking. It became a state secret that he suffered from multiple lung and heart ailments during his later years. There are unconfirmed reports that he possibly had Parkinson's disease in addition to amyotrophic lateral sclerosis, also known as Lou Gehrig's disease.
His final public appearance—and the last known photograph of him alive—had been on 27 May 1976, when he met the visiting Pakistani Prime Minister Zulfikar Ali Bhutto. He suffered two major heart attacks, one in March and another in July, then a third on 5 September, rendering him an invalid. He died nearly four days later, at 00:10 on 9 September 1976, at the age of 82. The Communist Party delayed the announcement of his death until 16:00, when a national radio broadcast announced the news and appealed for party unity.

Mao's embalmed body, draped in the CCP flag, lay in state at the Great Hall of the People for one week. One million Chinese filed past to pay their final respects, many crying openly or displaying sadness, while foreigners watched on television. Mao's official portrait hung on the wall with a banner reading: "Carry on the cause left by Chairman Mao and carry on the cause of proletarian revolution to the end". On 17 September the body was taken in a minibus to the 305 Hospital, where his internal organs were preserved in formaldehyde.

On 18 September, guns, sirens, whistles and horns across China were simultaneously blown and a mandatory three-minute silence was observed. Tiananmen Square was packed with millions of people and a military band played "The Internationale". Hua Guofeng concluded the service with a 20-minute-long eulogy atop Tiananmen Gate. Despite Mao's request to be cremated, his body was later permanently put on display in the Mausoleum of Mao Zedong, in order for the Chinese nation to pay its respects.

Legacy

Mao remains a controversial figure and there is little agreement over his legacy both in China and abroad. He is regarded as one of the most important and influential individuals in the twentieth century. He is also known as a political intellect, theorist, military strategist, poet, and visionary. He was credited and praised for driving imperialism out of China, having unified China and for ending the previous decades of civil war. He is also credited with having improved the status of women in China and for improving literacy and education. In December 2013, a poll from the state-run Global Times indicated that roughly 85% of the 1,045 respondents surveyed felt that Mao's achievements outweighed his mistakes.

His policies resulted in the deaths of tens of millions of people in China during his 27-year reign, more than any other 20th-century leader; estimates of the number of people who died under his regime range from 40 million to as many as 80 million, done through starvation, persecution, prison labour in laogai, and mass executions. Mao rarely gave direct instruction for peoples' physical elimination. According to biographer Philip Short, the overwhelming majority of those killed by Mao's policies were unintended casualties of famine, while the other three or four million, in Mao's view, were the necessary victim's in the struggle to transform China. Many sources describe Mao's China as an autocratic and totalitarian regime responsible for mass repression, as well as the destruction of religious and cultural artifacts and sites (particularly during the Cultural Revolution).

China's population grew from around 550 million to over 900 million under his rule while the government did not strictly enforce its family planning policy, leading his successors such as Deng Xiaoping to take a strict one-child policy to cope with human overpopulation. Mao's revolutionary tactics continue to be used by insurgents, and his political ideology continues to be embraced by many Communist organisations around the world.

In mainland China, Mao is revered by many members and supporters of the Chinese Communist Party and respected by a great number of the general population. Mobo Gao, in his 2008 book The Battle for China's Past: Mao and the Cultural Revolution, credits him for raising the average life expectancy from 35 in 1949 to 63 by 1975, bringing "unity and stability to a country that had been plagued by civil wars and foreign invasions", and laying the foundation for China to "become the equal of the great global powers". Gao also lauds him for carrying out massive land reform, promoting the status of women, improving popular literacy, and positively "transform(ing) Chinese society beyond recognition." Mao is credited for boosting literacy (only 20% of the population could read in 1949, compared to 65.5% thirty years later), doubling life expectancy, a near doubling of the population, and developing China's industry and infrastructure, paving the way for its position as a world power.

Mao also has Chinese critics. Opposition to him can lead to censorship or professional repercussions in mainland China, and is often done in private settings such as the Internet. When a video of Bi Fujian insulting him at a private dinner in 2015 went viral, Bi garnered the support of Weibo users, with 80% of them saying in a poll that Bi should not apologize amidst backlash from state affiliates. In the West, Mao has a bad reputation. He is known for the deaths during the Great Leap Forward and for persecutions during the Cultural Revolution. Chinese citizens are aware of Mao's mistakes, but nonetheless, many see Mao as a national hero. He is seen as someone who successfully liberated the country from Japanese occupation and from Western imperialist exploitation dating back to the Opium Wars. A 2019 study showed that a sizeable amount of the Chinese population, when asked about the Maoist era, described a world of purity and simplicity, where life had clear meaning, people trusted and helped one another and inequality was minimal. According to the study, older people felt some degree of nostalgia for the past and expressed support for Mao even while acknowledging negative experiences.

Though the Chinese Communist Party, which Mao led to power, has rejected in practice the economic fundamentals of much of Mao's ideology, it retains for itself many of the powers established under Mao's reign: it controls the Chinese army, police, courts and media and does not permit multi-party elections at the national or local level, except in Hong Kong and Macau. Thus it is difficult to gauge the true extent of support for the Chinese Communist Party and Mao's legacy within mainland China. For its part, the Chinese government continues to officially regard Mao as a national hero. On 25 December 2008, China opened the Mao Zedong Square to visitors in his home town of central Hunan Province to mark the 115th anniversary of his birth.

There continue to be disagreements on Mao's legacy. Former party official Su Shachi has opined that "he was a great historical criminal, but he was also a great force for good." In a similar vein, journalist Liu Binyan has described Mao as "both monster and a genius." Some historians argue that Mao was "one of the great tyrants of the twentieth century", and a dictator comparable to Adolf Hitler and Joseph Stalin, with a death toll surpassing both. In The Black Book of Communism, Jean Louis Margolin writes that "Mao Zedong was so powerful that he was often known as the Red Emperor. ... the violence he erected into a whole system far exceeds any national tradition of violence that we might find in China." Mao was frequently likened to the First Emperor of a unified China, Qin Shi Huang, and personally enjoyed the comparison. During a speech to party cadre in 1958, Mao said he had far outdone Qin Shi Huang in his policy against intellectuals: "What did he amount to? He only buried alive 460 scholars, while we buried 46,000. In our suppression of the counter-revolutionaries, did we not kill some counter-revolutionary intellectuals? I once debated with the democratic people: You accuse us of acting like Ch'in-shih-huang, but you are wrong; we surpass him 100 times." As a result of such tactics, critics have compared it to Nazi Germany.

Others, such as Philip Short in Mao: A Life, reject comparisons by saying that whereas the deaths caused by Nazi Germany and Soviet Russia were largely systematic and deliberate, the overwhelming majority of the deaths under Mao were unintended consequences of famine. Short stated that landlord class were not exterminated as a people due to Mao's belief in redemption through thought reform, and compared Mao with 19th-century Chinese reformers who challenged China's traditional beliefs in the era of China's clashes with Western colonial powers. Short writes that "Mao's tragedy and his grandeur were that he remained to the end in thrall to his own revolutionary dreams. ... He freed China from the straitjacket of its Confucian past, but the bright Red future he promised turned out to be a sterile purgatory. In their 2013 biography, Mao: The Real Story, Alexander V. Pantsov and Steven I. Levine assert that Mao was both "a successful creator and ultimately an evil destroyer" but also argue that he was a complicated figure who should not be lionised as a saint or reduced to a demon, as he "indeed tried his best to bring about prosperity and gain international respect for his country."

Mao's English interpreter Sidney Rittenberg wrote in his memoir The Man Who Stayed Behind that whilst Mao "was a great leader in history", he was also "a great criminal because, not that he wanted to, not that he intended to, but in fact, his wild fantasies led to the deaths of tens of millions of people." Dikötter argues that CCP leaders "glorified violence and were inured to massive loss of life. And all of them shared an ideology in which the end justified the means. In 1962, having lost millions of people in his province, Li Jingquan compared the Great Leap Forward to the Long March in which only one in ten had made it to the end: 'We are not weak, we are stronger, we have kept the backbone. Regarding the large-scale irrigation projects, Dikötter stresses that, in spite of Mao being in a good position to see the human cost, they continued unabated for several years, and ultimately claimed the lives of hundreds of thousands of exhausted villagers. He also writes: "In a chilling precursor of Cambodia under the Khmer Rouge, villagers in Qingshui and Gansu called these projects the 'killing fields.

The United States placed a trade embargo on the People's Republic as a result of its involvement in the Korean War, lasting until Richard Nixon decided that developing relations with the PRC would be useful in dealing with the Soviet Union. The television series Biography stated: "[Mao] turned China from a feudal backwater into one of the most powerful countries in the World. ... The Chinese system he overthrew was backward and corrupt; few would argue the fact that he dragged China into the 20th century. But at a cost in human lives that is staggering." In the book China in the 21st Century: What Everyone Needs to Know published in 2010, Professor Jeffrey Wasserstrom of the University of California, Irvine compares China's relationship to Mao to Americans' remembrance of Andrew Jackson; both countries regard the leaders in a positive light, despite their respective roles in devastating policies. Jackson forcibly moved Native Americans through the Trail of Tears, resulting in thousands of deaths, while Mao was at the helm during the violent years of the Cultural Revolution and the Great Leap Forward.

The ideology of Maoism has influenced many Communists, mainly in the Third World, including revolutionary movements such as Cambodia's Khmer Rouge, Peru's Shining Path, and the Nepalese revolutionary movement. Under the influence of Mao's agrarian socialism and Cultural Revolution, Cambodia's Pol Pot conceived of his disastrous Year Zero policies which purged the nation of its teachers, artists and intellectuals and emptied its cities, resulting in the Cambodian genocide. The Revolutionary Communist Party, USA, also claims Marxism–Leninism-Maoism as its ideology, as do other Communist Parties around the world which are part of the Revolutionary Internationalist Movement. China itself has moved sharply away from Maoism since Mao's death, and most people outside of China who describe themselves as Maoist regard the Deng Xiaoping reforms to be a betrayal of Maoism, in line with Mao's view of "Capitalist roaders" within the Communist Party. As the Chinese government instituted market economic reforms starting in the late 1970s and as later Chinese leaders took power, less recognition was given to the status of Mao. This accompanied a decline in state recognition of Mao in later years in contrast to previous years when the state organised numerous events and seminars commemorating Mao's 100th birthday. Nevertheless, the Chinese government has never officially repudiated the tactics of Mao. Deng Xiaoping, who was opposed to the Great Leap Forward and the Cultural Revolution, stated that "when we write about his mistakes we should not exaggerate, for otherwise we shall be discrediting Chairman Mao Zedong and this would mean discrediting our party and state."

Mao's military writings continue to have a large amount of influence both among those who seek to create an insurgency and those who seek to crush one, especially in manners of guerrilla warfare, at which Mao is popularly regarded as a genius. The Nepali Maoists were highly influenced by Mao's views on protracted war, new democracy, support of masses, permanency of revolution and the Great Proletarian Cultural Revolution. Mao's major contribution to the military science is his theory of People's War, with not only guerrilla warfare but more importantly, Mobile Warfare methodologies. Mao had successfully applied Mobile Warfare in the Korean War, and was able to encircle, push back and then halt the UN forces in Korea, despite the clear superiority of UN firepower. In 1957, Mao also gave the impression that he might even welcome a nuclear war.

Mao's poems and writings are frequently cited by both Chinese and non-Chinese. The official Chinese translation of President Barack Obama's inauguration speech used a famous line from one of Mao's poems. In the mid-1990s, Mao's picture began to appear on all new renminbi currency from the People's Republic of China. This was officially instituted as an anti-counterfeiting measure as Mao's face is widely recognised in contrast to the generic figures that appear in older currency. On 13 March 2006, a story in the People's Daily reported that a proposal had been made to print the portraits of Sun Yat-sen and Deng Xiaoping.

Public image
Mao gave contradicting statements on the subject of personality cults. In 1955, as a response to the Khrushchev Report that criticised Joseph Stalin, Mao stated that personality cults are "poisonous ideological survivals of the old society", and reaffirmed China's commitment to collective leadership. At the 1958 party congress in Chengdu, Mao expressed support for the personality cults of people whom he labelled as genuinely worthy figures, not those that expressed "blind worship".

In 1962, Mao proposed the Socialist Education Movement (SEM) in an attempt to educate the peasants to resist the "temptations" of feudalism and the sprouts of capitalism that he saw re-emerging in the countryside from Liu's economic reforms. Large quantities of politicised art were produced and circulated—with Mao at the centre. Numerous posters, badges, and musical compositions referenced Mao in the phrase "Chairman Mao is the red sun in our hearts" and a "Savior of the people".

In October 1966, Mao's Quotations from Chairman Mao Tse-tung, known as the Little Red Book, was published. Party members were encouraged to carry a copy with them, and possession was almost mandatory as a criterion for membership. According to Mao: The Unknown Story by Jun Yang, the mass publication and sale of this text contributed to making Mao the only millionaire created in 1950s China (332). Over the years, Mao's image became displayed almost everywhere, present in homes, offices and shops. His quotations were typographically emphasised by putting them in boldface or red type in even the most obscure writings. Music from the period emphasised Mao's stature, as did children's rhymes. The phrase "Long Live Chairman Mao for ten thousand years" was commonly heard during the era.

Mao also has a presence in China and around the world in popular culture, where his face adorns everything from T-shirts to coffee cups. Mao's granddaughter, Kong Dongmei, defended the phenomenon, stating that "it shows his influence, that he exists in people's consciousness and has influenced several generations of Chinese people's way of life. Just like Che Guevara's image, his has become a symbol of revolutionary culture." Since 1950, over 40 million people have visited Mao's birthplace in Shaoshan, Hunan.

A 2016 survey by YouGov survey found that 42% of American millennials have never heard of Mao. According to the CIS poll, in 2019 only 21% of Australian millennials were familiar with Mao Zedong. In 2020s China, members of Generation Z are embracing Mao's revolutionary ideas, including violence against the capitalist class, amid rising social inequality, long working hours, and decreasing economic opportunities.

Foreign honours
 Grand Cross of the Royal Order of Cambodia (Cambodia, 1956)

Genealogy

Ancestors
Mao's ancestors were:
  (born Xiangtan 1870, died Shaoshan 1920), father, courtesy name  or also known as Mao Jen-sheng
  (born Xiangxiang 1867, died 1919), mother. She was illiterate and a devout Buddhist. She was a descendant of Wen Tianxiang.
  (born 1846, died 1904), paternal grandfather
  (given name not recorded, born 1847, died 1884), paternal grandmother
 , paternal great-grandfather

Wives

Mao had four wives who gave birth to a total of 10 children, among them:
 Luo Yixiu (1889–1910) of Shaoshan: married 1907 to 1910
 Yang Kaihui (1901–1930) of Changsha: married 1921 to 1927, executed by the KMT in 1930; mother to Mao Anying, Mao Anqing, and Mao Anlong
 He Zizhen (1910–1984) of Jiangxi: married May 1928 to 1937; mother to 6 children
 Jiang Qing (1914–1991), married 1939 until Mao's death; mother to Li Na

Siblings
Mao had several siblings:
 Mao Zemin (1895–1943), younger brother, executed by a warlord
 Mao Zetan (1905–1935), younger brother, executed by the KMT
 Mao Zejian (1905–1929), adopted sister, executed by the KMT

Mao's parents altogether had five sons and two daughters. Two of the sons and both daughters died young, leaving the three brothers Mao Zedong, Mao Zemin, and Mao Zetan. Like all three of Mao Zedong's wives, Mao Zemin and Mao Zetan were communists. Like Yang Kaihui, both Mao Zemin and Mao Zetan were killed in warfare during Mao Zedong's lifetime. Note that the character zé appears in all of the siblings' given names; this is a common Chinese naming convention.

From the next generation, Mao Zemin's son Mao Yuanxin was raised by Mao Zedong's family, and he became Mao Zedong's liaison with the Politburo in 1975. In Li Zhisui's The Private Life of Chairman Mao, Mao Yuanxin played a role in the final power-struggles.

Children

Mao had a total of ten children, including:
 Mao Anqing (1923–2007): son to Yang, married to Shao Hua, son Mao Xinyu, grandson Mao Dongdong
 Mao Anlong (1927–1931): son to Yang, died during the Chinese Civil War
 Mao Anhong: son to He, left to Mao's younger brother Zetan and then to one of Zetan's guards when he went off to war, was never heard of again

Mao's first and second daughters were left to local villagers because it was too dangerous to raise them while fighting the Kuomintang and later the Japanese. Their youngest daughter (born in early 1938 in Moscow after Mao separated) and one other child (born 1933) died in infancy. Two English researchers who retraced the entire Long March route in 2002–2003 located a woman whom they believe might well be one of the missing children abandoned by Mao to peasants in 1935. Ed Jocelyn and Andrew McEwen hope a member of the Mao family will respond to requests for a DNA test.

Through his ten children, Mao became grandfather to twelve grandchildren, many of whom he never knew. He has many great-grandchildren alive today. One of his granddaughters is businesswoman Kong Dongmei, one of the richest people in China. His grandson Mao Xinyu is a general in the Chinese army. Both he and Kong have written books about their grandfather.

Personal life

Mao's private life was kept very secret at the time of his rule. After Mao's death, Li Zhisui, his personal physician, published The Private Life of Chairman Mao, a memoir which mentions some aspects of Mao's private life, such as chain-smoking cigarettes, addiction to powerful sleeping pills and large number of sexual partners. Some scholars and others who knew Mao personally have disputed the accuracy of these characterisations.

Having grown up in Hunan, Mao spoke Mandarin with a marked Hunanese accent. Ross Terrill wrote Mao was a "son of the soil ... rural and unsophisticated" in origins, while Clare Hollingworth said that Mao was proud of his "peasant ways and manners", having a strong Hunanese accent and providing "earthy" comments on sexual matters. Lee Feigon said that Mao's "earthiness" meant that he remained connected to "everyday Chinese life."

Sinologist Stuart Schram emphasised Mao's ruthlessness but also noted that he showed no sign of taking pleasure in torture or killing in the revolutionary cause. Lee Feigon considered Mao "draconian and authoritarian" when threatened but opined that he was not the "kind of villain that his mentor Stalin was". Alexander Pantsov and Steven I. Levine wrote that Mao was a "man of complex moods", who "tried his best to bring about prosperity and gain international respect" for China, being "neither a saint nor a demon." They noted that in early life, he strove to be "a strong, wilful, and purposeful hero, not bound by any moral chains", and that he "passionately desired fame and power".

Mao learned to speak some English, particularly through Zhang Hanzhi, his English teacher, interpreter and diplomat who later married Qiao Guanhua, Foreign Minister of China and the head of China's UN delegation. His spoken English was limited to a few single words, phrases, and some short sentences. He first chose to systematically learn English in the 1950s, which was very unusual as the main foreign language first taught in Chinese schools at that time was Russian.

Writings and calligraphy

Mao was a prolific writer of political and philosophical literature. The main repository of his pre-1949 writings is the Selected Works of Mao Zedong, published in four volumes by the People's Publishing House since 1951. A fifth volume, which brought the timeline up to 1957, was briefly issued during the leadership of Hua Guofeng, but subsequently withdrawn from circulation for its perceived ideological errors. There has never been an official "Complete Works of Mao Zedong" collecting all his known publications. Mao is the attributed author of Quotations from Chairman Mao Tse-tung, known in the West as the "Little Red Book" and in Cultural Revolution China as the "Red Treasure Book". First published in January 1964, this is a collection of short extracts from his many speeches and articles (most found in the Selected Works), edited by Lin Biao, and ordered topically. The Little Red Book contains some of Mao's most widely known quotes.{{efn|Among them are:

{{blockquote|"Taken as a whole, the Chinese revolutionary movement led by the Communist Party embraces two stages, i.e., the democratic and the socialist revolutions, which are two essentially different revolutionary processes, and the second process can be carried through only after the first has been completed. The democratic revolution is the necessary preparation for the socialist revolution, and the socialist revolution is the inevitable sequel to the democratic revolution. The ultimate aim for which all communists strive is to bring about a socialist and communist society."|source="The Chinese Revolution and the Chinese Communist Party" (December 1939), Selected Works of Mao Tse-tung, II, pp. 330–331.}}
}}

Mao wrote prolifically on political strategy, commentary, and philosophy both before and after he assumed power. Mao was also a skilled Chinese calligrapher with a highly personal style. In China, Mao was considered a master calligrapher during his lifetime. His calligraphy can be seen today throughout mainland China. His work gave rise to a new form of Chinese calligraphy called "Mao-style" or Maoti, which has gained increasing popularity since his death. There exist various competitions specialising in Mao-style calligraphy.

Literary works

As did most Chinese intellectuals of his generation, Mao's education began with Chinese classical literature. Mao told Edgar Snow in 1936 that he had started the study of the Confucian Analects and the Four Books at a village school when he was eight, but that the books he most enjoyed reading were Water Margin, Journey to the West, the Romance of the Three Kingdoms and Dream of the Red Chamber. Mao published poems in classical forms starting in his youth and his abilities as a poet contributed to his image in China after he came to power in 1949. His style was influenced by the great Tang dynasty poets Li Bai and Li He.

Some of his most well-known poems are "Changsha" (1925), "The Double Ninth" (October 1929), "Loushan Pass" (1935), "The Long March" (1935), "Snow" (February 1936), "The PLA Captures Nanjing" (1949), "Reply to Li Shuyi" (11 May 1957), and "Ode to the Plum Blossom" (December 1961).

Portrayal in film and television
Mao has been portrayed in film and television numerous times. Some notable actors include: Han Shi, the first actor ever to have portrayed Mao, in a 1978 drama Dielianhua and later again in a 1980 film Cross the Dadu River; Gu Yue, who had portrayed Mao 84 times on screen throughout his 27-year career and had won the Best Actor title at the Hundred Flowers Awards in 1990 and 1993; Liu Ye, who played a young Mao in The Founding of a Party (2011); Tang Guoqiang, who has frequently portrayed Mao in more recent times, in the films The Long March (1996) and The Founding of a Republic (2009), and the television series Huang Yanpei (2010), among others. Mao is a principal character in American composer John Adams' opera Nixon in China (1987). The Beatles' song "Revolution" refers to Mao in the verse "but if you go carrying pictures of Chairman Mao you ain't going to make it with anyone anyhow..."; John Lennon expressed regret over including these lines in the song in 1972.

See also

 Chinese tunic suit

 Notes 

References

Bibliography

 
 
 
 
 
 
 
 
 
 
 
 
 
 
 
 
 
 , which is superseded by Ross Terrill. Mao: A Biography.'' (Stanford, CA: Stanford University Press, 1999. 
 

Further reading

 
 
 
 

External links

General
 "Foundations of Chinese Foreign Policy online documents in English from the Wilson Center in Washington
 Asia Source biography
 ChineseMao.com: Extensive resources about Mao Zedong 
 CNN profile
 Collected Works of Mao at the Maoist Internationalist Movement
 Collected Works of Mao Tse-tung (1917–1949) Joint Publications Research Service
 Mao quotations
 Mao Zedong Reference Archive at marxists.org
 Oxford Companion to World Politics: Mao Zedong
 Bio of Mao at the official Communist Party of China web site

Commentary
 Discusses the life, military influence and writings of Chairman Mao ZeDong.
 What Maoism Has Contributed by Samir Amin (21 September 2006)
 China must confront dark past, says Mao confidant
 Mao was cruel – but also laid the ground for today's China
 On the Role of Mao Zedong by William Hinton. Monthly Review Foundation 2004 Volume 56, Issue 04 (September)
 Propaganda paintings showing Mao as the great leader of China
 Remembering Mao's Victims
 Mao's Great Leap to Famine
 Finding the Facts About Mao's Victims
 Remembering China's Great Helmsman
 Did Mao Really Kill Millions in the Great Leap Forward? 
 Mao Tse Tung: China's Peasant Emperor

|-
|colspan="3" style="text-align:center;"|Communist Party of China|-

|-

|-

|-

|-

|-
|colspan="3" style="text-align:center;"|Chinese Soviet Republic|-

|-

|-
|colspan="3" style="text-align:center;"|People's Republic of China'''
|-

|-

|-

|-

 
1893 births
1976 deaths
Mao Zedong family
20th-century atheists
20th-century Chinese heads of government
20th-century Chinese philosophers
20th-century Chinese poets
Articles containing video clips
Anti-imperialism
Anti-revisionists
Chairpersons of the National Committee of the Chinese People's Political Consultative Conference
Chinese anti-capitalists
Chinese atheists
Chinese communists
Chinese guerrillas
Chinese male writers
Chinese Marxists
Chinese military writers
Chinese nationalists
Chinese people of World War II
Chinese political philosophers
Chinese political writers
Chinese revolutionaries
Chinese Communist Party politicians from Hunan
Communist poets
Critics of religions
Deified Chinese people
Delegates to the 1st National Congress of the Chinese Communist Party
Delegates to the 3rd National Congress of the Chinese Communist Party
Delegates to the 5th National Congress of the Chinese Communist Party
Former Buddhists
General Secretaries and Chairmen of the Chinese Communist Party
Guerrilla warfare theorists
Hunan First Normal University alumni
 
Members of the 6th Central Committee of the Chinese Communist Party
Members of the 7th Politburo of the Chinese Communist Party
Members of the 8th Politburo Standing Committee of the Chinese Communist Party
Members of the 9th Politburo Standing Committee of the Chinese Communist Party
Members of the 10th Politburo Standing Committee of the Chinese Communist Party
People of the Chinese Civil War
People of the Cold War
People of the Cultural Revolution
People with Parkinson's disease
People's Republic of China poets
People's Republic of China politicians from Hunan
Philosophers from Hunan
Poets from Hunan
Politicians from Xiangtan
Politicide perpetrators
Presidents of the People's Republic of China
Republic of China writers
Revolution theorists